Jalan Lencongan Barat or Sungai Petani Western Bypass, Federal Route 257, is a major highway bypass in Sungai Petani, Kedah, Malaysia. The Kilometre Zero of the Federal Route 257 is located at Sungai Petani South.

History
In 2013, the highway was gazetted as Federal Route 257.

Features
At most sections, the Federal Route 257 was built under the JKR R5 road standard, allowing maximum speed limit of up to 90 km/h.

List of junctions

References

See also
  Jalan Lencongan Timur

Highways in Malaysia
Sungai Petani Ring Road
Malaysian Federal Roads